Lar (also Romanized as Lār; also known as Larestan) is a city and capital of Larestan County, Fars Province, Iran. At the 2006 census, its population was 51,961, in 12,891 families. Lar's inhabitants are Larestani people.

History 
The city was originally called Lar after the person who had first established the city. Lar (لاڑ) is the name of one of Shahnameh's famous heroes. Around 16th and 17th centuries, Lar was considered to be a major stop along the road to the Persian Gulf.

Larestani people migrated to Arab states in the Persian Gulf in significant figures around the 1600s, such as Qatar, the UAE, Bahrain, and Kuwait. Some have surname as "Lari" or "Al Lari" along with many other family and tribal names.

Climate
Lar has a hot desert climate (BWh).

Civilization 
Lar city is divided into two areas: new-city (called Shahre-jadid) and old-city (called Shahre-ghadim). New-city, which was constructed after the historical earthquake of 1960, now accommodates the main population and is considered to be modern in terms of civil and transport engineering (e.g. dead-ends are very rare). The Old city contains the Bazaar of Qaisariye, a pre-Safavid dynasty creation, that was proposed as a UNESCO World Heritage Site on August 9, 2007.

Transport 

As the Department of Roads & transport & some other centres are situated in city of Lar, an interesting aspect of it is building & construction of a modern expressway between the city of Lar and a police station 10 km from the city of Gerash, but in the cost of cutting most spending from other town & villages' roads in the region & it costs human life in the road accidents in the regions which happens almost daily & have high fatality rates. The  6-lane expressway has been fully upgraded with high luminous lighting and high quality pavement to facilitate the transportation needs of people of Lar town but the cost is paid by cutting almost all other funds for repairs & making new roads in the area who are governed by Lar Road & Transport Department in Lar.

Lar has an airport with daily flights to domestic and international destinations including Tehran, Dubai, Kuwait, Doha, Sharjah, etc.

Gallery

References

External links 

 Gerash - Information on history, demographics and photos of this region
 Khodmooni Forum Connecting Khodmoonis All Over the World
 Emaddeh information Up to date information about Emaddeh & Other Achmoi areas, news, photos, etc.
 

Populated places in Gerash County
Cities in Fars Province